Pertti Kalervo Poutiainen (5 December 1952 — 11 June 1978) was a Finnish chess International Master (IM) (1976), two-times Finnish Chess Championship winner (1974, 1976).

Biography
In the 1970s Pertti Poutiainen was one of the top Finnish chess players. He has twice won gold medals at the Finnish Chess Championships (1974, 1976). In 1975, Pertti Poutiainen participated in FIDE Zonal tournament for World Chess Championship. In 1976 he was awarded the title of International Master (IM).

Pertti Poutiainen played for Finland in the Chess Olympiad:
 In 1974, at second board in the 21st Chess Olympiad in Nice (+6, =5, -7).

Pertti Poutiainen played for Finland in the World Student Team Chess Championship:
 In 1974, at first board in the 20th World Student Team Chess Championship in Teesside (+5, =4, -4).

Pertti Poutiainen played for Finland in the Nordic Chess Cups:
 In 1973, at second board in the 4th Nordic Chess Cup in Ribe (+2, =0, -3),
 In 1974, at first board in the 5th Nordic Chess Cup in Eckernförde (+2, =2, -1),
 In 1975, at first board in the 6th Nordic Chess Cup in Hindås (+2, =1, -2) and won team bronze medal.

Serious dysfunction and the pursuit of game perfection eventually led to his suicide in 1978.

References

External links

Pertti Poutiainen chess games at 365chess.com

1952 births
1978 suicides
Sportspeople from Helsinki
Finnish chess players
Chess International Masters
Chess Olympiad competitors
Suicides in Finland
20th-century chess players
1978 deaths